Doxford International is a  business park located at the A19 / A690 interchange on the outskirts of Sunderland, in the North East of England. Previously it was a greenfield site, it was designated as an Enterprise Zone in 1990 in response to the decline of the area's former ship building and coal mining industries. The first buildings were completed in 1992, providing accommodation for a range of businesses that have played a key role in the regeneration of the City.

At the entrance to the development stands the sculpture Quintisection by the sculptor Robert Erskine FRBS. Commissioned by Doxford International Business Park, Quintesection is a sculpture to mark the shipbuilding industry of the North East.

The availability of telecommunications and a skilled workforce has been instrumental in the success of Doxford International, which is now a location for corporate HQs and contact centres serving the financial and customer service sectors. Around 8,000 people are now employed by a range of blue chip companies.

One business that located on Doxford International is mobile phone operator EE Limited, which has a customer support centre that now employs around 1,000 people. The site operates as a switching centre, underpinning the company's network between Leeds and Edinburgh.

Also on Doxford International, EDS has established a secure data centre. Citifinancial - part of the USA-based CitiGroup - was one of the businesses that has reinvested in Doxford International, with an expansion project that brought additional jobs to Sunderland. CitiGroup no longer have a presence at Doxford, leaving the site in 2009.

EDF Energy has based its main contact centre at Doxford, originally trading at the site as London Electricity.

As well as small retail outlets such as Greggs the bakers and a Subway outlet, the Sunderland Health & Racquet Club operated by David Lloyd Leisure provides leisure facilities.

Businesses on Doxford International Business Park

Financial services
 Barclays plc (UK, Banking)
 More Than (Royal & SunAlliance) (UK, Insurance)
 Computershare

Contact centres
 Kura CS (Formally Parseq) (Outsource Contact Centre)
 EDF Energy plc (France, Customer Service Centre)
 Royal Mail (UK, Contact Centre)
 EE (UK, Contact Centre)
 ECO (UK, Contact Centre)

Head offices
 NIKE Inc. Retail UK 
 4Projects (Local, Business Software)
 Arriva plc (Local, Public Transport)
 Desco (Design & Consultancy) Ltd. (Local, Consulting Engineers)
 Gentoo Group (Local, Property Development)
 Wilcomm Homes (Local, House Builder)
 Melonite UK Ltd (Local, Telecommunications and Data)
 Andrew and Pete

Other companies
 Kinaxia Logistics
 Bowmer & Kirkland (UK, Contractor)
 Former EDS (Electronic Data Systems) now HP Enterprise Services UK Ltd (USA, Secure Data Centre)
 Manitowoc Cranes Group (USA, Mobile Cranes)
 Northern Gas Networks Ltd. (UK, Customer Service Centre)

Buildings and structures in the City of Sunderland
Economy of the City of Sunderland
Business parks of England
Sunderland